Scott Resnick (born December 5, 1986) is a tech business executive and former alderman of the Common Council in City of Madison, Wisconsin, representing the 8th District from 2011-2015. The 8th District incorporates areas including: State Street, the University of Wisconsin-Madison campus, and Spring Street neighborhood.

Personal life

Scott Resnick graduated from University of Wisconsin–Madison in 2009,  with a Bachelor of Arts degree in Political Science and Legal Studies. He married his wife, Kelly, in 2013.

Resnick is well known for his work in the entrepreneurship community in Madison. He was instrumental in the creation of Hardin Design & Development, a web development company founded by his former dorm neighbor, Jon Hardin. Resnick currently serves as the company's Chief Operating Officer.

Political life

Election

On April 8, 2011, Resnick was elected to his first term on the Common Council. He beat opponent Kyle Szarzynski by a vote total 1180 to 880 (57% to 42%). There was no incumbent in the race.

Re-election

On April 2, 2013, Resnick was re-elected to the Madison Common Council. His opponent, Christian Hansen, withdrew from the race late in the election season, allowing Resnick to win reelection unopposed. Following his reelection, the Madison Common Council voted Resnick to be the Council's pro tem, second in line in Council authority to that term's Council President, Chris Schmidt.

Aldermanic career

In 2012, Resnick introduced and passed Wisconsin's first open data ordinance. The ordinance made all datasets created by public employees of the City available to the public for free. The entrepreneurship community greatly supported this initiative and enabled developers to create innovative web and mobile applications using city data.  

Scott served on the Ad Hoc Committee on Moped Parking, the Downtown Coordinating Committee, Economic Development Committee, Joint Southeast Campus Area Committee, Madison Cultural Arts District Board, and Vending Oversight Committee.

2015 mayoral race

On July 21, 2014, Resnick officially announced his candidacy for the 2015 Madison mayoral election. Scott pledged to use his campaign and potential administration as vehicles for introducing innovative, 21st century thinking to city government. Commentators noted that Resnick "does have a certain amount of political muscle at his back," and labeled him as a strong contender in the race against four competitors, including incumbent mayor Paul Soglin. 

Resnick advanced through the February mayoral primary, placing second with 23.3% of the vote. However, he was soundly defeated in the April general election, where Soglin won over 70% of the voters.

StartingBlock Madison

Following his campaign for mayor and end of his time on the Common Council, Resnick was announced as the executive director of StartingBlock, a Madison "entrepreneurial hub" dedicated to supporting local start-up businesses. Resnick oversaw the completion of StartingBlock's initial fundraising campaign and served as executive director until 2017, when he switched roles to become StartingBlock's entrepreneur-in-residence.

References

Living people
Wisconsin city council members
Politicians from Madison, Wisconsin
1986 births
University of Wisconsin–Madison College of Letters and Science alumni